Ratanlal Brahmin was an Indian politician. He was elected to the Lok Sabha, lower house of the Parliament of India from Darjeeling , West Bengal as a member of the Communist Party of India (Marxist). He was earlier a member of the West Bengal Legislative Assembly as a member of the undivided Communist Party of India.

References

External links
  Official biographical sketch in Parliament of India website

India MPs 1971–1977
1900 births
Lok Sabha members from West Bengal
1989 deaths
Communist Party of India (Marxist) politicians from West Bengal
Communist Party of India politicians from West Bengal
Members of the West Bengal Legislative Assembly
People from Darjeeling district